Acrotome mozambiquensis is a species of flowering plant in the family Lamiaceae. It is native to South Mozambique. It was first published in 1935.

References

Lamiaceae